Luís Miguel Bilro Pereira (born 1 April 1971), known as Bilro, is a Portuguese retired football and beach soccer player.

While playing association football, in a career that lasted over a decade, he operated as right back or central defender, having represented União de Leiria during 11 professional seasons.

He amassed Primeira Liga totals of 245 games and nine goals.

Football career
Bilro was born in Borba, Évora District. After finishing his footballing formation at Sporting CP he made his professional debut with Seixal FC, where he had begun as an infant. He went to represent Atlético Clube de Portugal and S.C. Olhanense, returning to Sporting for 1992–93 and spending an entire season without any official appearances, being released afterwards.

After leaving Sporting, Bilro moved to U.D. Leiria, where he would appear in nearly 400 competitive matches, helping the club achieve Primeira Liga promotion in his first year and being coached in the 2001–02 campaign by young manager José Mourinho, as the side from the Lis River finished seventh.

Beach soccer
After spending the latter part of 2004–05 with modest S.C. Lusitânia, Bilro moved to beach soccer, helping the Portugal national team win the BSWW Mundialito in 2008 and 2009. Shortly after, he moved back to Sporting but in his new sport.

In 2011, Bilro retired at the age of 40 and started coaching his last team.

Honours

Beach soccer

Country
Euro League: 2007, 2008
FIFA World Cup: Third place 2008
Euro League: 2007 (in Portugal); Runner-up 2007 (Italy); Third place 2007 (Spain)
Mundialito: 2008, 2009; Runner-up 2007

References

External links

1971 births
Living people
Portuguese footballers
Association football defenders
Primeira Liga players
Liga Portugal 2 players
Segunda Divisão players
Seixal F.C. players
Atlético Clube de Portugal players
S.C. Olhanense players
Sporting CP footballers
U.D. Leiria players
S.C. Lusitânia players
Portugal youth international footballers
Portuguese beach soccer players
Sportspeople from Évora District